H. Albert Wrucke (March 1, 1868 – April 1, 1953) was an American politician and businessman.

Born near Iron Ridge, Wisconsin, Wrucke taught school and was principal of the Campbellsport, Wisconsin school. He also worked for a bank and insurance company. Wrucke was the first village clerk of Campbellsport, Wisconsin. He was also justice of the peace and served on the school board as director and clerk. Wrucke served on the Fond du Lac County, Wisconsin Board of Supervisors and was a Republican. In 1931, Wrucke served in the Wisconsin State Assembly, representing the second district of Fond du Lac County. Wrucke died of a stroke at his home in Campbellsport, Wisconsin.

Notes

1868 births
1953 deaths
People from Iron Ridge, Wisconsin
People from Campbellsport, Wisconsin
Businesspeople from Wisconsin
Educators from Wisconsin
County supervisors in Wisconsin
School board members in Wisconsin
Republican Party members of the Wisconsin State Assembly